Ezio Auditore da Firenze is a fictional character in the video game series Assassin's Creed, an Italian master assassin who serves as the protagonist of the series' games set during the Italian Renaissance. His life and career as an assassin are chronicled in Assassin's Creed II, II: Discovery, Brotherhood, and Revelations, and the short films Assassin's Creed: Lineage and Assassin's Creed Embers. All games (excluding II: Discovery) and films he appears in were re-released as an enhanced bundle, The Ezio Collection, in 2016. Ezio has also been frequently referenced or made smaller appearances in other media within the franchise. Actor Roger Craig Smith has consistently provided the character's voice throughout his appearances, while Devon Bostick portrayed him in live-action in Lineage.

Within the series' alternate historical setting, Ezio was born into Italian nobility from Florence in the year 1459. His family had long been loyal to the Assassin Brotherhood, a fictional organization inspired by the real-life Order of Assassins dedicated to protecting peace and freedom, but Ezio did not learn about his Assassin heritage until his late teens, after most of his immediate kin were killed during the Pazzi conspiracy. His quest to track down those responsible for killing his family eventually sets him up against the villainous Templar Order led by the House of Borgia. Spending years to fight against Rodrigo and Cesare Borgia and their henchmen, he eventually re-establishes the Brotherhood as the dominant force in Italy. His further adventures lead him to Spain and the Ottoman Empire, where he is also essential in overcoming Templar threats and restoring the Assassins. After his retirement from the Brotherhood, he lives a peaceful life in rural Tuscany until his eventual death from a heart attack in 1524.

The character has received critical acclaim and is often named among the greatest video game characters of all time. While most of his praise focuses on his portrayal and growth throughout the series, as well as the unique chronicling of his entire life, he has also been noted as one of the most attractive video game characters of all time. Due to his reception and the fact that he is the only character in the series who is the protagonist of multiple major installments of the franchise, he is usually considered the face of the franchise and its most popular character. Ezio's popularity has led to several crossover appearances outside of the Assassin's Creed series, notably Soulcalibur V, Fortnite, and Brawlhalla, as a guest character.

Development
When creating the character, the developers were keen on establishing similarities between the series' previous protagonist Altaïr Ibn-La'Ahad in style and general appearance, while at the same time differentiating Ezio from the former characterwise. His name, meaning eagle, was chosen to keep up the tradition of Altaïr, whose name meant "flying one". While Altaïr was described as a warrior monk bred for combat and the life of an assassin, Ezio's backstory was consciously designed in sharp contrast to make playing him feel like an "empowering experience". Unlike Altaïr, Ezio is not born into the order and discovers his heritage only in his teens, while his main goal for most of the first game is to seek revenge on those who murdered his family. Even though this was made to be his main motivation for the early part of the game, his personal growth was to enable him to seek justice as the game progressed. He does not start out as a master assassin but has to hone his craft throughout, making him more relatable to players. Ezio learns new moves and abilities by being taught by friends and allies, unlike a progression tree, to make the players immersion into the character feel more natural. In general, Ezio was designed to be a Renaissance man, who was to be open minded and seek truth, but also be fun-loving. The creative director of Assassin's Creed III, Alex Hutchinson, compared Ezio to actor Errol Flynn, as he was designed to be an over-the-top womanizer and braggart.

Fictional character biography

Assassin's Creed II and II: Discovery
Ezio is an ancestor (on the paternal side) of Desmond Miles, the protagonist of most of the early series' modern-day sequences, who experiences Ezio's life through the Animus, a device unlocking hidden memories inside his DNA. As it is shown in the beginning of Assassin's Creed II, Ezio was born into the noble Auditore family in the Italian city of Florence in 1459. Tutored by the banker Giovanni Tornabuoni until the age of 17, Ezio led an affluent, care-free lifestyle until his father Giovanni discovered a plot to assassinate the leaders of Florence. Giovanni accused Francesco de' Pazzi as a conspirator, but when he presented the evidence to the gonfaloniere of Florence, Uberto Alberti, the latter is revealed to also be a conspirator and orders for the Auditore family's arrest, blaming them for the plot. Out running errands for his father, Ezio is not home when his father and two brothers are arrested and later publicly hanged, which Ezio sees happen. Following his father's final advice, Ezio finds his Assassin suit and tools before fleeing the city with his mother and sister to his uncle Mario's estate in Monteriggioni. Mario assists Ezio in discovering the people behind the conspiracy and trains him to become an Assassin. 

While exacting revenge on the Pazzi family and attempting to thwart their plot, Ezio discovers that more people from outside Florence are involved. The search for those responsible spans over a decade and leads Ezio from Florence to San Gimignano, Forlì, and eventually Venice. As he identifies and assassinates various political figures involved in the conspiracy, Ezio also gains several allies, including Niccolò Machiavelli, Caterina Sforza, and Leonardo da Vinci. These allies partly set Ezio on a path of redemption, helping him overcome his anger towards his father and brothers' killers, and guide him on his quest. Eventually, the conspiracy leads to the mastermind behind the plot: Rodrigo Borgia, Grand Master of the Italian Templars, who seeks to find the Apple of Eden—a powerful artifact created by a precursor race to control humanity, and one of the many "Pieces of Eden". In 1488, Ezio intercepts the Apple and confronts Rodrigo, who reveals that he believes himself to be "the Prophet", who will lead the Templars to a fabled "Vault". Ezio and Rodrigo then fight, and although Ezio is initially overpowered, his allies arrive and chase Rodrigo away. Ezio's allies then reveal themselves as Assassins and, believing Ezio to be the true Prophet, allow him to join their ranks.

While defending Forlì from an army of mercenaries hired by Rodrigo to retrieve the pages of Altaïr Ibn-LaʼAhad's Codex, Ezio is injured and has the Apple stolen from him. After recovering, he learns the man who stole the Apple is Girolamo Savonarola, and sets out to find him. In Assassin's Creed II: Discovery, which takes place from 1491 to 1492, Ezio temporarily abandons his search for Savonarola in order to free his fellow Assassins in Spain, who have been imprisoned under the guise of the Spanish Inquisition. In the process, Ezio discovers that the Templars are planning to sail west to discover the New World. Ezio must protect Christopher Columbus and confront Tomás de Torquemada to end the Templar threat. Along the way, Ezio saves many imprisoned Assassins who help him, including Luis de Santángel and Raphael Sanchez. In the end, Granada is taken under siege by Templars, and Ezio has to save the Moorish King Muhammad XII to put an end to the war. 

In 1497, Ezio returns to Florence during the mass burning of sinful objects in the city, ordered by Savonarola, who has taken over Florence after using the Apple to turn its citizens against the Medici and have them removed from power. Amidst the chaos, Ezio kills Savonarola and his followers, recovering the Apple and allowing the people of Florence to elect a new leader. By 1499, Ezio and his allies have completed Altaïr's Codex, which is revealed to be a world map, and discover that "the Vault" sought by Rodrigo lies in Rome and has to be opened with the Apple and the Papal Staff, another Piece of Eden—explaining Rodrigo's motivation to become Pope in 1492. While his allies distract the city's guards, Ezio infiltrates the Vatican using the Apple and attempts to assassinate Rodrigo, who is empowered by the Staff. After Rodrigo is unable to open the Vault, he and Ezio fight, and although Ezio emerges victorious, he chooses to spare Rodrigo's life, having realized that killing him will not bring back his family. Now in possession of both the Apple and the Staff, Ezio opens the Vault, where a holographic figure approaches him. Identifying herself as Minerva, a member of the race that created humanity and the Pieces of Eden, she confirms that Ezio is the Prophet, and delivers a message, intended for Desmond, about a cataclysmic solar flare only Desmond can prevent. As Minerva's projection fades, Ezio is left confused as he questions who Desmond is.

Assassin's Creed: Brotherhood
At the start of Assassin's Creed: Brotherhood, Ezio escapes Rome with his uncle Mario and returns to Montereggioni, where he informs his family and allies of what he saw inside the Vault, as well as his decision to spare Rodrigo. While Niccolò Machiavelli challenges Ezio's decision, the latter is comforted by the prospect that his personal vendetta is finally over. However, the following day, Monteriggioni is besieged by the Papal Armies commanded by Cesare Borgia, Rodrigo's son and co-leader of the Templar Order. During the siege, the Apple is lost, Monteriggioni is destroyed, and Mario is killed by Cesare. Escaping the city with his mother and sister, an injured Ezio sets off for Rome to destroy the Borgias once and for all; however, he collapses shortly thereafter. Days later, Ezio awakens in Rome and receives a new set of gear from Machiavelli, who also saved him days earlier. After his wounds heal, Ezio and Machiavelli set their plan into motion – to liberate Rome and remove the Borgias from power permanently, as well as retrieve the Apple from the Templars

Slowly, over the next three and a half years, Ezio and his allies win a series of victories over the Borgias, reclaiming and restoring the city by destroying the Borgias' allies and resources. Ezio restores the ranks of the Assassins and in time succeeds Machiavelli as Mentor, the leader of the Brotherhood. By 1503, Ezio has assassinated the clan's banker, Juan Borgia, and their French general ally, the Baron de Valois, and incapacitated Lucrezia Borgia, leaving their power base in disarray. Cesare, in a fit of rage, kills his father and begins losing control over the city. After retrieving the Apple, Ezio uses its power to destroy what is left of Cesare's army and allies. By the end of 1503, Borgia control over Rome is completely broken and Cesare is arrested by the new Pope, Julius II, though he eventually breaks out of prison three years later. Ezio rejects the Apple and hides it below the Colosseum in the Temple of Juno, though not before using it to find Cesare. In 1507, Ezio travels to the Kingdom of Navarre (northern Spain) and catches up with Cesare at the siege of Viana Castle. Ultimately defeating Cesare, Ezio throws him off the castle walls to his death.

Assassin's Creed: Revelations
After the events of Brotherhood, Ezio discovers a letter left behind by his father that talks about a hidden library full of vast knowledge underneath Masyaf Castle, left there by the legendary Assassin Altaïr Ibn-La'Ahad, setting the events of Assassin's Creed: Revelations into motion. Arriving at Masyaf in early 1511, Ezio is ambushed by a regiment of Templars who occupy the Assassins' former fortress, also searching for Altaïr's library. After escaping capture and assassinating the Templar captain, Ezio recovers the journal of Niccolò Polo, which tells of five seals hidden in Constantinople that will open the door to Altaïr's library. Arriving in Constantinople, Ezio begins his search for the seals, while helping the local Assassin Guild, led by Yusuf Tazim, to overthrow Byzantine Templar control. Over time, Ezio succeeds in eradicating Templar influence and resubjugating the city to the rule of the family of Prince Suleiman.

Ezio recovers four of the five keys with the help of historian and book collector Sofia Sartor, for whom he soon develops romantic feelings, but chooses to keep in the dark as to his real reason for seeking the keys, fearing she will be targeted by the Templars. After discovering the Templars' base of operations is an underground city in Cappadocia, Ezio travels there and assassinates the Templar leader Manuel Palaiologos, recovering the final key from him. However, he then learns that the real mastermind behind the Templar plot to open Altaïr's library is Suleiman's uncle Prince Ahmet, who proceeds to kill Yusuf and kidnap Sofia to force Ezio to give up the keys. Ezio rallies the Ottoman Assassins to fight Ahmet's forces and ultimately saves Sofia, before chasing and subduing a fleeing Ahmet with her help. A returning sultan Selim I, Suleiman's father, kills Ahmet and thanks Ezio for saving his son and country, but at the same time orders him to leave the Ottoman Empire and never return.

With all the keys in their possession, Ezio and Sofia travel back to Masyaf and open the library, where Ezio finds Altaïr's skeleton. Through a sixth key, Ezio discovers the entire purpose of the library was to convey another message to Altaïr and Ezio's common descendant, Desmond Miles, through Altaïr's own Apple of Eden. Ezio, realizing he has reached the end of the journey and wishing to live a normal life with Sofia, decides to leave the Apple behind and talks directly to Desmond. While he does not comprehend how they are able to communicate or why Desmond has been observing him, he understands to an extent that his role was important to him and hopes that he helped Desmond find the answers he seeks.

Assassin's Creed: Embers
In the animated short film Assassin's Creed: Embers, the last years of Ezio's life are chronicled. After his retirement from the Assassins Brotherhood, he has settled down in a Tuscan villa near Monteriggioni with Sofia, with whom he had two children: Flavia and Marcello. By 1524, Ezio's health is deteriorating and he is making preparations for the day he will inevitably die, including a letter addressed to Sofia that he has spent some time trying to write. One day, a mysterious Chinese woman appears, requesting his help. The woman, Shao Jun, is a member of the vanquished Chinese Assassin Brotherhood and seeks Ezio's advice on how to help her people and rebuild their order. While sympathetic, Ezio wishes for her to leave, refusing to get involved with the Assassins again, but Sofia allows Jun to stay and rest from her journey. Jun continues to press for Ezio to help her and he reluctantly agrees, telling her about his life so that she would gain a new perspective on what it means to be an Assassin. After helping Jun fight off soldiers sent by the Chinese Emperor Jiajing, Ezio sees Jun on her way back to China, armed with the wisdom she came seeking him for, as well as a box for her to open if she ever loses her way. 

Later, Ezio goes on a trip to the market square in Florence with Sofia and Flavia. Tired, Ezio sits down, watching his wife and daughter before being approached by a young man who reminds him of his younger self. After a brief conversation, Ezio suffers what appears to be a heart attack; the man tells Ezio to "get some rest" and abruptly leaves. Moments later, Ezio takes one final look at Sofia and Flavia before passing away peacefully at the age of 65. The film concludes with Ezio's finished letter to Sofia being read, in which he reveals that of all the things that kept him going throughout life, love for the world and people around him was the strongest of them all.

Other appearances

Assassin's Creed series

Video games 
In the modern-day section of Assassin's Creed IV: Black Flag, a market analysis for Abstergo Entertainment, the fictional video games subsidiary of Abstergo Industries, can be found via hacking computers. The Market Analysis reveals Abstergo was looking into the possibility of using Ezio as the protagonist of a future project, but ultimately decided against it due to his violent and womanizing nature and him "corrupting" people into following the Assassins' flawed ideology. Despite this, in Assassin's Creed Unity, Abstergo has produced a fictional video game starring Ezio, titled Fear and Loathing in Florence, which can be seen at the start.

In Assassin's Creed Odyssey, Ezio makes a minor appearance when the protagonist Kassandra gets a vision of the future after she defeats the Cult of Kosmos. In Assassin's Creed Valhalla, Ezio is indirectly mentioned by Gonlodr (Minerva's equivalent in Norse mythology) when she tells Odin that she has been hearing voices from the future, in particular that of a "Prophet". Gonlodr tries to communicate with this Prophet, only to be met with silence; however, as she and Odin leave, the Prophet can be heard talking back, questioning who Gonlodr is. This mirrors Ezio's interaction with Minerva at the end of Assassin's Creed II. Additionally, in the modern-day section of Valhalla, the player can listen to audio tapes of Desmond talking about his ancestors. In one such tape, he mentions that Ezio felt regret and guilt after inadvertently killing numerous civilians when he destroyed a large amount of gunpowder in Cappadocia during the events of Assassin's Creed: Revelations, and that this event was likely what caused Ezio to become disillusioned with the Assassins, as he retired soon after.

In the spin-off game Assassin's Creed Chronicles: China, which follows Shao Jun after the events of Embers, Jun applies Ezio's teachings in her quest to restore the Chinese Assassin Brotherhood and considers him her mentor. In the mobile game Assassin's Creed Identity, which takes place during the events of Brotherhood, Ezio makes a non-playable appearance in the Forlì - A Crimson Sunset expansion, helping the protagonist, Lo Sparviero ("The Eagle"), rescue Niccolò Machiavelli after the latter is captured by Borgia mercenaries. In 2018, Ezio became a playable character in the free to play role-playing mobile game Assassin's Creed Rebellion. Like II: Discovery, the game is set during the Spanish Inquisition and features multiple characters from different installments of the series, as they build a brotherhood to overthrow the Spanish Templar Order.

Ezio's Brotherhood outfit has been featured as an unlockable cosmetic option in all subsequent releases of the series. His Assassin's Creed II outfit has also been featured in several games, including Valhalla, added as part of the final content update for the game in December 2022.

Expanded media 
Ezio is a supporting character in the live-action short film Assassin's Creed: Lineage, which follows his father Giovanni during the events leading up to Assassin's Creed II; he is portrayed by Devon Bostick. He also appears in the animated short Assassin's Creed: Ascendance, set during the events of Brotherhood, where he meets with his friend Leonardo da Vinci to gather intel on Cesare Borgia and learns about the latter's rise to power.

Ezio is a playable character in the 2021 board game Assassin's Creed: Brotherhood of Venice by Triton Noir. The game features an original storyline set between the events of Brotherhood and Revelations.

In literature, he appears as the protagonist of the novels Assassin's Creed: Renaissance, Assassin's Creed: Brotherhood, and Assassin's Creed: Revelations by Oliver Bowden, which adapt each of the major games featuring him. He is also featured as the narrator of the novel Assassin's Creed: The Secret Crusade, which sees him reading Niccolò Polo's journal recounting the life of Altaïr Ibn-La'Ahad on his way to Constantinople during the events of Revelations. In 2017, Ezio appeared in the first issue of the Assassin's Creed: Reflections comic book miniseries, which sees him comforting a dying Leonardo da Vinci in 1519 while recounting his first encounter with Lisa Gherardini, the noblewoman who later served as the inspiration for Leonardo's Mona Lisa.

Soulcalibur V
Ezio also appears as a guest character in the 2012 fighting game Soulcalibur V. In the non-canonical storyline of the game, Ezio discovers a strange artifact in 1506, while on his way to Navarre to fight Cesare Borgia. On his voyage by sea, he dispatches a group of Templars plotting to overthrow Catherine of Aragon with said artifact. After touching what turns out to be a piece of the cursed blade Soul Edge, Ezio is transported 100 years into the future, where he fights against the characters of the series in an effort to collect all pieces of Soul Edge and its counterpart, Soul Calibur. Once he has collected all shards of the legendary swords, he is transported back to his own time and next seen back on his ship to Navarre.

Brawlhalla
In July 2022, Ezio was added as a playable character to the fighting game Brawlhalla, alongside Eivor Varinsdottir from Assassin's Creed Valhalla.

Others
Ezio's robes are unlockable in the PlayStation 3 and Xbox 360 versions of Prince of Persia: The Forgotten Sands, Final Fantasy XIII-2 as well as in LittleBigPlanet for the PlayStation 3 and PowerUp Heroes for Kinect on the Xbox 360. His outfit, under the name the "Dashin' Hashashin", was presented as promotional headgear to Team Fortress 2 players who had pre-ordered Assassin's Creed: Revelations, along with a special knife modeled after his hidden blade (called "The Sharp Dresser") for the Spy class in the game. In both Final Fantasy XIII-2 and XV, Ezio's outfit was unlockable in special events. In a time-limited special event in Monster Hunter World, players were able to unlock Ezio's robes as a special armor.

Ezio appears as a guest character in the 2014 and 2020 free to play role-playing mobile games Soul Hunters and AFK Arena, through a collaboration between developer Lilith Games and Ubisoft. Ezio later appeared as a boss in another one of Ubisoft's titles, For Honor. In the fighting game, players are encouraged to duel with and kill Ezio in a time-limited special event, active from December 2018 to January 2019. In March 2022, Ezio was added as a playable character in Fortnite Battle Royale. He could be unlocked from the in-game store or by purchasing Assassin’s Creed Valhalla or its Dawn of Ragnarök DLC on the Epic Games Store before March 2023. His skin was released on Fall Guys and the mobile Battle Royale game Free Fire

Ezio's likeness, along with five other series protagonists, was used for a line of character-themed wine labels as part of a joint collaboration between Ubisoft and winemaker Lot18; the full name of his label is "2015 Ezio Auditore Super Tuscan Red Blend", a reference to his birthplace of Tuscany.

Reception and legacy

The character was critically acclaimed by the media and general public alike, with his depiction and transformation, as well as the chronicling of his entire life drawing significant praise. He is the only character in the series to receive several main games. Ezio is widely regarded as the series' best character and the face of the franchise, often finishing first in rankings of the series' characters. With the exception of II: Discovery (a Nintendo DS release), all games and films he appears in were re-released as an enhanced bundle, The Ezio Collection, for PlayStation 4 and Xbox One,  in 2016. 

Initial reception for Ezio as a character was positive. GamesRadar characterized him as an "ass-kicking, morally ambiguous superhero" and noted that he had a livelier and more charming personality than his predecessor Altaïr, with his personal growth being a central aspect of the narrative. Will Tutle of GameSpy also noted Ezio's growth and contrast to Altaïr as his strongest features, stating that while he was an unlikeable womanizer at first, he was later hoping he would "get his revenge and uncover the truth". In contrast, GameSpot'''s Kevin VanOrd called Ezio "terrific" and "instantly likeable", while praising him as a more realized character than Altaïr. In his review of Revelations, VanOrd lauded the developers for reflecting Ezio's age and weariness throughout the game, as well as highlighting his role as a mentor. Matt Miller of GameInformer stated that by Revelations, Ezio has grown from a boy seeking revenge to a man seeking wisdom, as well as a "venerable mentor", which was made a central aspect of his character. John Davison of GamePro named Ezio the epicenter of the game and drew a comparison between him and Nathan Drake. Like Drake, the "charming, witty, and comically self-deprecating" Ezio was "designed to draw the player into the narrative." 

Ezio Auditore received an award from GameSpot for the "Best New Character" in 2009. GameZone authors Natalie Romano and Angelina Sandoval listed him third for "Gaming God of 2009", which ranks the most attractive video game men of the year. He was also nominated at the Spike Video Game Awards 2010 for "Best Character". The 2011 Guinness World Records Gamer's Edition lists Ezio as the 35th most popular video game character. The praise for his portrayal has also placed him high in multiple all-decade or all-time rankings. Ezio was voted as the third top character of the 2000s decade by Game Informers readers. In 2012, GamesRadar+ ranked him as the eighth "most memorable, influential, and badass" protagonist in games due to his entire life being portrayed. They also placed him second on the list of most badass game characters of the generation, saying "Ezio has become synonymous with the image of the video game assassin." GamesRadar placed him at number 4 in a list of the 50 best game characters of the generation. Complex listed Ezio among the "most badass" video game characters of all time in 2013, ranking him at 37th place. Complex ranked him as having the tenth best fighting game cameo for his guest appearance in Soulcalibur V in 2012. He also featured on UGO Networkss list of most memorable Italians in video games at 15th place. In 2014, he was included in Game Informer's dream roster for the next Super Smash Bros. entry. In 2016, Glixel staff ranked Ezio as 7th most iconic video game character of the 21st century. In 2021, HobbyConsolas also included Ezio on their "The 30 best heroes of the last 30 years," while Rachel Weber of GamesRadar ranked Ezio as 25th of their "50 iconic video game characters."

The characters' physical attractiveness and clothing style have also been noted. At the 2010 Spike Video Game Awards, he won the award for "Best Dressed Assassin", while Paste named him as one of the "best costumed characters in videogames." GamesRadar named Ezio "Mister 2009" in their article on the sexiest new characters of the decade of 2000. Furthermore, PlayStation Official Magazine ranked Ezio fifth on their list of "finest facial hair gaming has to offer". Mashable'' ranked him 9th in a list of "the 10 most datable men in video games".

Notes

References

Bibliography

External links

Ezio Auditore on IMDb

Assassin's Creed characters
Fictional blade and dart throwers
Fictional Florentine people
Fictional Italian people in video games
Fictional characters from Tuscany
Fictional criminals in video games
Fictional explorers in video games
Fictional fist-load fighters 
Fictional hapkido practitioners
Fictional knife-fighters 
Fictional martial arts trainers
Fictional socialites
Fictional swordfighters in video games
Fictional traceurs and freerunners
Fighting game characters
Male characters in video games
Video game characters introduced in 2009
Video game mascots
Nobility characters in video games
Video game protagonists
Vigilante characters in video games
Spike Video Game Award winners
Fictional people from the 16th-century